Toby Lee (born 27 January 2005) is an English guitarist from Oxfordshire, England. Lee appeared on the television shows Little Big Shots and Ellen Show, and he starred in the musical School of Rock. At eight years old he taught himself how to play. He became a global sensation after playing guitar at BB King's blues club in 2015 when he was ten years old.

Career
Toby Lee posted a tribute video to BB King when he was 10 years old. The video went viral and Lee developed a following. After he gained a following on YouTube and on Facebook his career began to take shape. Toby Lee has had 350 million views on Youtube. Lee is now sponsored by Gibson Guitars.

In 2016, he played Zack in School Of Rock at the New London Theatre.
In 2017 he performed the blues with Ronnie Baker Brooks at the Blues Heaven Festival in Denmark, and the video amassed over 115 million views on Facebook within a year. In 2019, Lee played with Joe Bonamassa at the Royal Albert Hall.
Lee is playing on an upcoming Peter Frampton album.

Joe Bonamassa has called Toby Lee "a future superstar of the blues". Many refer to him as the future of the blues.

Awards
Young Blues Artist of the Year at the UK Blues Awards (2018)

Albums
EP "10" (2017)
Aquarius (2021)
Icons Vol. 1 (2022) – covers album

References

External links 
 Official website

2005 births
Living people
People from Oxfordshire
English blues guitarists
Blues rock musicians
Progressive rock guitarists
21st-century British male musicians
English male stage actors
English male musical theatre actors